Alphonso Deal (April 15, 1923 – June 3, 1987) was a Democratic member of the Pennsylvania House of Representatives. He was president of the North Philadelphia "Action" Branch of the NAACP.

References

Democratic Party members of the Pennsylvania House of Representatives
1987 deaths
1923 births
20th-century American politicians